Imad Faddoul (born 1 September 1953) is a Lebanese wrestler. He competed in the men's freestyle 82 kg at the 1976 Summer Olympics.

References

External links
 

1953 births
Living people
Lebanese male sport wrestlers
Olympic wrestlers of Lebanon
Wrestlers at the 1976 Summer Olympics
Place of birth missing (living people)